Dalal Khario (born circa 1997) is a Yazidi woman from northern Iraq who fled to Germany after escaping from ISIS.

On August 3, 2014, ISIS fighters conquered her village. Khario, then 17 years old, was abducted and spent nine months in captivity. She was forced to marry nine different men and was raped repeatedly. Khario was one of many young women abducted by ISIS; an estimated 4,000 women and children are still being held hostage. Khario's hometown of Hardan has been destroyed, and the bodies of 500 residents have been found in mass graves. Her family has been torn apart: her mother was taken to Syria, her younger sister is missing, and her brother is dead.

Khario's memoir, I Remain a Daughter of the Light (German: Ich bleibe eine Tocher des Lichts), was published in 2016 under the pseudonym "Shirin." In February 2017, she received the Women's Rights Award at the 9th annual Geneva Summit for Human Rights and Democracy. She said later that the experience was bittersweet because her mother and sister could not be there with her.

See also
 Farida Khalaf
 Nadia Murad
 Lamiya Haji Bashar

References

21st-century Iraqi women writers
Iraqi Yazidis
Iraqi human rights activists
German human rights activists
Women human rights activists
Year of birth uncertain
Pseudonymous women writers
21st-century pseudonymous writers
Yazidi women